Éric Leon Danty (9 December 1947 – 9 October 2020) was a French professional footballer who played as a defender.

Post-playing career
Danty created the Academy FC Meaux in 2007. He was the president of Meaux from 2010 to 2020.

Death 
Danty died on 9 October 2020 at the age of 72 in the Seine-et-Marne department.

Honours 
Meaux

 Division 4: 1979–80

References

1947 births
2020 deaths
People from Morne-à-l'Eau
French footballers
Guadeloupean footballers
French people of Guadeloupean descent
Association football defenders
Stade de Reims players
RCP Fontainebleau players
AC Mouzon players
CS Sedan Ardennes players
US Saint-Omer players
CS Meaux players
Championnat de France Amateur (1935–1971) players
Ligue 2 players
French Division 3 (1971–1993) players
French Division 4 (1978–1993) players
US Nœux-les-Mines players